KDTS may refer to:

 Destin Executive Airport (ICAO code KDTS)
 KDTS-LD, a low-power television station (channel 14, virtual 52) licensed to serve San Francisco, California, United States